KVGB may refer to:

 KVGB (AM), a radio station (1590 AM) licensed to Great Bend, Kansas, United States
 KVGB-FM, a radio station (104.3 FM) licensed to Great Bend, Kansas, United States